Border Morris is a collection of individual local dances from villages along the English side of the Wales–England border in the counties of Herefordshire, Worcestershire and Shropshire. They are part of the Morris dance tradition.

History 

This was a village dance done in winter for fun and a bit of money. It usually includes three to twelve dancers.

Some of the earliest accounts of a border morris tradition are provided by E.C. Cawte.  There is reference to questions about "any disguised persons, as morice dancers, maskers, or mum'ers" to St. Mary's Parish Church in Shrewsbury in 1584 and an amazing account of morris dancers at Hereford races in 1609, describing "two musicians, four whifflers, and twelve dancers, including hobby horse and maid marian", all from villages within 14 miles of Hereford.  The account claimed, "Hereford-shire for a morris-daunce puts downe, not onely all Kent, but verie neare (if one had line enough to measure it) three quarters of Christendome".

Cawte quotes further accounts describing complaints to the local magistrates about disruptive morris dancers in Longdon, Worcestershire, disrupting the Sabbath day from 1614 to 1617 and another account of dancers in Much Wenlock in 1652, causing a disturbance in an ale house at Nordley.  Later records from Shrewsbury mention payment to the "Bedlam Morris" in 1688 and 1689.

The dance depends on the numbers available, as at Brimfield. The dances collected from a particular place sometimes differ quite markedly between informants, as at White Ladies Aston, reflecting the flexibility from year to year. Sometimes a gang would only have one dance, sometimes two, or as at Malvern and Pershore an indeterminate set of figures.

The common features are the rather short sticks and sometimes a stick and handkerchief version of the same dance, also usually a high single step akin to the local country dance step. Such detail as starting foot rules and phrase endings are notable for their apparent absence.

Some of these village sides blackened their faces .  There is no record of any sides dancing together.  A few – both Upton-on-Severn dances for example – matched the complexity of Cotswolds Morris, but many – e.g. Bromsberrow Heath – had a stark simplicity of one figure and one chorus repeated forever.

Revival 

In the 1960s, E.C. Cawte, the folklorist, proposed that these dances from the English side of the Welsh borders – Herefordshire, Shropshire and Worcestershire – constituted a Welsh border tradition.

Since the 1960s and with further collecting in the 1970s by people such as Dave Jones (late of Silurian Morris, founded 1969, and later the Not For Joes) and Keith Francis (of Silurian Morris) a distinctive border morris style has grown. The tradition is characterised by black faces, tattered shirts or coats, much stick-clashing and a big band traditionally comprising melodeons, fiddles, concertinas, triangles and tambourines, although they now often also feature a tuba or sousaphone, and flute or oboe.

Under the guidance of Dave Jones and Keith Francis, Silurian Border Morris sought to interpret the collected dance material, preserving as much of the traditional styles and features as can be deduced. By contrast, in 1975, John Kirkpatrick created a new border tradition with the Shropshire Bedlams, which seeks to capture the spirit of the border sides, but not recreate any specific tradition or dance. Their dances feature much "whooping" and this has become characteristic amongst many other border sides. Perhaps in keeping with the original tradition, the Original Welsh Border Morris (founded 1973) meet only once a year, at Christmas, and dance the traditional dances of Herefordshire and Worcestershire. With many of the newer sides, the dances have often become complex, involving many invented and evolved steps, figures and choruses.

Many dances were collected by Cecil Sharp and later collectors, and several were included in Bacon's book, but border morris was largely neglected by revival morris sides until late in the 20th century. The Silurian Morris Men of Ledbury, Herefordshire, included border dances in performances from the early 1970s and changed exclusively to border morris in 1979, and the Shropshire Bedlams were founded in 1975; both became pioneers of a resurgence of border morris among revival sides in the following decades.

The Leominster Morris were reformed in 1988, split from The Breinton Morris (who disbanded after a further ten years.) Through contact with E.C. Cawte, with reference to notes made in Leominster, his talking with former dancer, Tom Postons, and his recollections of the dancing of the time as having "lots of bowing, hat-raising, and clashing of sticks on the ground" led to the "revival" of Postons' stick dance. Cecil Sharp visited the town on 27 December 1909 with local folklorist Ella Mary Leather, and collected tunes from the prolific local gypsy fiddler John Locke. The Leominster men use several of Locke's tunes in their repertoire today.

Border morris dancing was different on the Welsh side of the border, and a team on the Welsh side was formed in 1992. Initially the side was named Morys ar y Clwt but it was changed to Carreg-las in 1997. They use traditional Welsh and English folk and morris dance tunes. Carreg-las translates from the Welsh as 'bluestone', a rock found locally in the Preseli Mountains, of which it is said Stonehenge was constructed.

See also
Blackface and Morris dancing

References

External links 

 https://www.academia.edu/5468139/To_Black_up_Or_Not_to_Black_Up_A_Personal_Journey
 http://www.great-western.org.uk/dommett/BlackFace.pdf
 https://web.archive.org/web/20120222000637/http://www.ironmenandseverngilders.org/
Border Morris: Roots & Revival, Gordon Ashman
 Visit to Herefordshire and Worcestershire, May 1957.  E.C. Cawte
History of Border Morris
Breinton Morris's take on Border Morris
The Pershore Morris (pdf)
German carvings from 1480 showing "moriscan dancers" including black faces
Home page of the Silurian Border Morrismen
Mike Miller's Border Morris Notes
Mythago Morris Home page
Samples of the border sound
Styx of Stroud Border Morris home page
Vancouver Morris Men Winter Dances page
Steeleye Span - A Mummers Play (circa 1400)

Morris dance
Articles containing video clips
Blackface minstrelsy